Dyke Branch is a stream in the U.S. states of Kansas and Missouri. It is a tributary of Indian Creek.

Dyke Branch has the name of the local Dyke family.

See also
List of rivers of Missouri

References

Rivers of Jackson County, Missouri
Rivers of Johnson County, Kansas
Rivers of Missouri
Rivers of Kansas